Vatican may refer to:

Vatican City, the city-state ruled by the pope in Rome, including St. Peter's Basilica, Sistine Chapel, Vatican Museum

The Holy See
 The Holy See, the governing body of the worldwide Roman Catholic Church and city-state of Vatican City, consisting of the pope and the Roman Curia
 A metonym for the governance of the Roman Catholic Church, particularly when attributing doctrine
 Roman Curia, the administrative apparatus of the Holy See
 Vatican Library, of the Roman Curia.
 Vatican Apostolic Archive, which were separated from the Vatican Library in the 17th century
 Vatican Publishing House, the publisher of official documents of the Holy See, separated from the Vatican Library in 1926

Vatican City
 Vatican City, the city-state ruled by the pope in Rome, Italy, including St. Peter's Basilica, Sistine Chapel, Vatican Museums
 Apostolic Palace, the official residence of the pope on the Vatican Hill, sometimes called the Vatican Palace
 St. Peter's Basilica, principal church on the Vatican Hill, also known as the Vatican Basilica
 Vatican Museums, contain cultural wealth of the Vatican

Geography
 Ager Vaticanus, the alluvial plain on the right bank of the Tiber down to the Aventine hill and up to the confluence of the Cremera creek
 Vatican Hill, a hill in Rome on the opposite side of the Tiber from the traditional seven hills of Rome

Other uses 
 Vatican, Louisiana, an unincorporated community in the United States
 The Vatican (mixtape), a mixtape by Natas
 Vatican Miracle Examiner, a 2016 Japanese light novel series